In geometry, the elongated pyramids are an infinite set of polyhedra, constructed by adjoining an  pyramid to an  prism. Along with the set of pyramids, these figures are topologically self-dual.

There are three elongated pyramids that are Johnson solids: 
 Elongated triangular pyramid,
Elongated square pyramid, and
Elongated pentagonal pyramid. 
Higher forms can be constructed with isosceles triangles.

Forms

See also
 Gyroelongated bipyramid
 Elongated bipyramid
 Gyroelongated pyramid
 Diminished trapezohedron

References
Norman W. Johnson, "Convex Solids with Regular Faces", Canadian Journal of Mathematics, 18, 1966, pages 169–200. Contains the original enumeration of the 92 solids and the conjecture that there are no others.
  The first proof that there are only 92 Johnson solids.

Pyramids and bipyramids